Ernest Bernard Bonelli (July 27, 1919 – October 12, 2009) was an American football player for the Chicago Cardinals and Pittsburgh Steelers of the National Football League.

Early life
He  won a football scholarship to the University of Pittsburgh, where he played fullback and defensive back for coach Jock Sutherland.

In 1941, he enlisted in the United States Army Air Corps and served as a radar operator on B-17 bombers.  In 1942, he was part of the invasion of North Africa at Casablanca. He also played football for the Third Air Force Gremlins, sharing the backfield with Charley Trippi. After World War II ended, he returned to Pittsburgh and played in the 1945 College All-Star Game.

Football career
He was signed by the Cardinals for the 1945 season, appearing in seven games as a running back, kick returner, and defensive back.  He was traded to the Steelers for 1946, where he appeared in three games as a running back.  He retired after the 1946 season and later worked in medical sales in Pittsburgh.

Bonelli was selected to the Italian-American Sports Hall of Fame, the Fox Chapel Area Hall of Fame and the Western Pennsylvania Sports Hall of Fame.  He died on October 12, 2009 at age 90.

References

1919 births
2009 deaths
People from West Deer Township, Pennsylvania
Chicago Cardinals players
Pittsburgh Panthers football players
Pittsburgh Steelers players
Third Air Force Gremlins football players
United States Army Air Forces personnel of World War II
United States Army Air Forces soldiers
Players of American football from Pennsylvania